Sahayathrikakku Snehapoorvam is a 2000 Malayalam comedy film directed by M. Shankar. It stars Kunchacko Boban and Kavya Madhavan.

Plot 
Saji and his friend Maya Sakkariya who are college-mates. Both are jobless after completing their graduation in journalism. They are the happy go-lucky kind who spend days making merry with their friends. They decide to try their luck in television serial production. Maya writes the script and Saji acts as the hero. Saji's father who agrees to invest money in the project as he himself has cherished a dream of becoming an actor.
But Saji's brother who opposes Saji's plans. Saji and his friends` attempts to evade Saji's brother often lead to some comic situations. As the shooting progresses, Saji faces the severest challenge of his life. He is passing through the most critical face of his life. His family plunges into a very serious financial crisis. A financier files suit against his father for breach of promise which comes as a bolt from the blue for Saji. Now, he is badly in need of a job. Responsibility is born out of necessity. His brother somehow manages to gets a state minister to recommend Saji for an opening as a reporter in a television channel. On the other side, his friend Maya too faces the similar problem. She too comes out as the second claimant for the same post. The events that unfold as both Maya and Saji compete for the same post through various events comprise the rest of the movie.

Cast 
 Kunchacko Boban as Saji
 Kavya Madhavan as Maya
 Innocent
 Jagadish
 Ambili Devi
 Maniyanpilla Raju
 N. F. Varghese
 Joemon Joshy

Soundtrack
"Alasa Kolasa (Male Version)" - K.J. Yesudas
"Alasa Kolasa" - K J Yesudas, K.S.Chitra
"Anadhiyam (Male Version)" - K.J. Yesudas
"Anadhiyam (Female Version)" - K. S. Chithra)
"Chellam Chellam" - K.J. Yesudas
"Muthuvilakkilo" - M. G. Sreekumar
"Olive Thaliritto" - K.J. Yesudas
"Pranayakavitha" - Mohan Sithara

References

2000 films
2000s Malayalam-language films
Films scored by Mohan Sithara